Eduardo Arce Peña (born 25 January 1989) is a Mexican former professional footballer and current manager of Puebla in Mexico.

References

1989 births
Living people
Association football midfielders
Atlético Mexiquense footballers
Toros Neza footballers
Atlante F.C. footballers
C.F. Mérida footballers
Club Puebla players
Coras de Nayarit F.C. footballers
Liga MX players
Ascenso MX players
Liga Premier de México players
Mexican football managers
Footballers from the State of Mexico
People from Toluca
Mexican footballers